Scott Mercier (born January 24, 1968) is an American former cyclist. He participated in 1 grand tour, the 1997 Vuelta a España. He also competed in the team time trial at the 1992 Summer Olympics.

Palmares 

1993
1st stage 4 Tour of Willamette
1994
1st stage 1 Tour of Hawaii
1995
1st stage 5 Cascade Cycling Classic
1st Prologue and stage 8 Tour de Taiwan
2nd Herald Sun Tour
1st stage 9
1996
1st Giro del Capo
1st Rapport Toer
1st Tour de Toona
1st stages 3 and 4
1999
1st stage 1 International Cycling Classic
2000
1st stage 4 American Cup

References

1968 births
Living people
American male cyclists
Olympic cyclists of the United States
Cyclists at the 1992 Summer Olympics
People from Telluride, Colorado